Minle station can refer to:
Minle station (Chengdu Metro), a metro station in Chengdu, Sichuan, China
Minle station (Shenzhen Metro), a metro station in Shenzhen, Guangdong, China
, a railway station in Minle County, Zhangye, Gansu, China

See also
Millak station, a metro station in Busan, South Korea